Jeremy Harry Bird (born 14 September 1989) is a British sport shooter. He participated at the 2019 World Shotgun Championships, where he won skeet bronze.

References

External links

Living people
1989 births
British male sport shooters
Skeet shooters
European Games competitors for Great Britain
Shooters at the 2019 European Games
21st-century British people